Mouhameth Sané (born 26 January 1996) is a Senegalese footballer who currently plays as a defender for Mulhouse.

Career statistics

Club

Notes

References

1996 births
Living people
Senegalese footballers
Senegal youth international footballers
Senegalese expatriate footballers
Association football defenders
Championnat National 3 players
Championnat National 2 players
Dijon FCO players
AJ Auxerre players
FC Mulhouse players
Expatriate footballers in France
Senegalese expatriate sportspeople in France